The Beco do Pinto, also known as Beco do Colégio, is a passage located between the Casa Número Um and Solar da Marquesa de Santos in the center of São Paulo. It links the streets Roberto Simonsen and Bitterncourt Rodrigues. In Brazil's colonial times, it had the function of allowing the transit of people and animals between the "Largo da Sé" and the meadow of Tamanduateí River. Today, under the administration of "Casa da Imagem" (also known as "Casa Número Um"), it houses projects especially developed for the space by contemporary artists. It also constitutes an important architectural, historical and cultural setting, together with buildings that surround it, and integrates the Museu da Cidade de São Paulo.

History 

The alley was named after Brigadeiro José Joaquim Pinto de Moraes Leme. In 1821, the military man, then owner of the townhouse – a house that later came to be known as Solar da Marquesa de Santos – made the first significant change regarding the passage and began a complicated relationship with the Câmara Municipal.

In addition to being a way of strategical communication that linked the higher part of the city with the lower part, where there was concentration of the trades of São Paulo, the Alley also was a path where the slaves went to fetch water and discard domestic waste. And, for being a steep and winding passage, many chose not to go down to the meadow and dumped the trash wherever they went. Troubled with it, the Brigadeiro closed the Beco do Pinto with a gate, however, this change did not last long, because the order was contested and forbidden by the City Hall, due to it being a public service.

José Joaquim Pinto was again notified a few years later, this time for having expanded his backyard with the construction of a wall. The change would have affected the insulation from the neighboring house, today the Casa Número Um. The wall was demolished in 1826.  The passage was reopened by the City Hall, receiving the official name of Beco do Colégio.

Marquesa de Santos 
Domitila de Castro Canto e Melo, the Marquesa de Santos, bought the Solar in 1834. Together with the purchase, came the requirement that the City Hall allow the reconstruction of the demolished wall and the re-installation from the Beco's gate, alleging that there would be no guarantee of security to their property without the usage of such measures. In 1849, the request was attended by the City Hall.

Currently 
In 1912, after the opening from the slope of Carmo, actual Avenue Rangel Pestana, the Beco lost its function and was deactivated.

Currently, the Beco do Pinto is under the responsibility of the Secretaria Municipal de Cultura, and is administered by Casa da Imagem. It integrates the Museu da Cidade de São Paulo and houses artistic installations produced only for this location.

Architectural features 
The Beco do Pinto was constructed originally so that transit was possible between the old street of Carmo – today, street Roberto Simonsen – and the meadow of Tamanduateí river (near what currently is street Bittencourt Rodrigues), places divided by a large slope.

It is configured architecturally on a staircase permeated by bids, which alternate between flat and inclined. The steps are made of granite and the flat throws are covered with Portuguese stones. The lateral boundaries are defined by the lots of neighbouring buildings, the Casa Número Um (current Casa da Imagem) and the Solar da Marquesa de Santos.

The Beco is sited in a ground of 368,40 m² and has two extremities marked by gates with boss and triangular pediment. The gate from the Roberto Simonsen street presents neoclassic ornaments, aduela and the coat of arms of Brazil, in low relief. In addition, there are two archaeological showcases that exhibit vestiges of the old footwear.

Cultural and historical significance 
The Beco do Pinto marks the linking between two buildings of exceptional historical value for the city of São Paulo: the Solar da Marquesa de Santos and the Casa Número Um. Beyond that, the passage also represents an important historical mark for having been, during the years from the Brazilian colonial age, the main link between the urban center, concentrated around the Pátio do Colégio, and the Tamanduateí river, located where there was a commercial grouping.

Heritage Listing 
The conservation from Beco do Pinto is protected by the Decree number 26.818, from September 9, 1988, created during the government of Jânio Quadros in São Paulo. It determines the preservation of goods located inside the perimeter of Pátio do Colégio, in the Center of the municipality.

Actual state 

Today, having lost its passage function, the Beco has obtained an artistic value. Since 2011, artists have been creating installations specifically for the place. The first was made by Laura Vinci, what, with a work that released mists, reflecting about the passage of time.

Gallery

References

Tourist attractions in São Paulo
National heritage sites of São Paulo (state)